Henry William Mallin (1 June 1892 – 8 November 1969) was an English middleweight amateur boxer. He came originally from Hackney Wick, his younger brother was the Olympic boxer Fred Mallin. He lived in Dartmouth Park, North London and was a police officer with the Metropolitan Police.

Boxing career
Mallin was Amateur Boxing Association British middleweight champion five years in a row from 1919 to 1923. He was also world champion in the middleweight class between 1920 and 1928. He never lost an amateur bout and never turned professional.

In the 1920 Summer Olympics he won a gold medal in middleweight division, defeating Canadian boxer Georges Prud'Homme in the final. In 1924 he went on to win another gold in the same weight class. In that year, he met Roger Brousse of France in the quarter-finals, and after the decision came down 2–1 in favour of Brousse, Mallin showed the referee fresh teeth marks on his chest, which further examination proved that Mallin had definitely been bitten by his French opponent. Brousse was disqualified, clearing the way for Mallin to win his second gold medal. After the incident versus Brousse, Mallin was referred to by one reporter as "the unroasted human beef of Old England".

Mallin was the first to successfully defend an Olympic title in two consecutive games, and still remains the only male British boxer to do so.

Subsequently, he managed the British Olympic boxing teams at the 1936 and 1952 Summer Olympics.

In 1937, he achieved the distinction of being the first British television sports commentator, when he gave commentary on two boxing matches that were broadcast by the BBC from Alexandra Palace.

Henry Mallin died at a nursing home in Lewisham in November 1969.

References

1892 births
1969 deaths
People from Hackney Wick
Boxers from Greater London
English male boxers
Middleweight boxers
Olympic boxers of Great Britain
Boxers at the 1920 Summer Olympics
Boxers at the 1924 Summer Olympics
English Olympic medallists
Olympic gold medallists for Great Britain
England Boxing champions
Olympic medalists in boxing
Medalists at the 1924 Summer Olympics
Medalists at the 1920 Summer Olympics
Metropolitan Police officers